Emmons H. Woolwine (1899-1951) was an architect of Nashville, Tennessee.
At least two of his works are listed on the U.S. National Register of Historic Places.

Works
Works include:
Davidson County Courthouse, Public Sq. Nashville, Tennessee (Woolwine,Emmons, with Hirons and Dennison), NRHP-listed
Dickson County War Memorial Building, 225 Center Ave., Dickson, Tennessee (Woolwine, Emmons H.), NRHP-listed
 John Sevier State Office Building (1940)

References

1899 births
1951 deaths
20th-century American architects
People from Nashville, Tennessee
Architects from Tennessee